ASD Geas Basket is an Italian women's basketball club from Sesto San Giovanni founded in 1955. 

Geas was the Serie A's leading team in the 1970s, with eight national championships between 1970 and 1978. The rossoneri culminated this golden era winning the 1978 European Cup, becoming the first team from Western Europe to win the trophy.

Most recently, Geas was 3rd in the 2011 Serie A.

Titles
 European Cup
 1978
 Serie A
 1970, 1971, 1972, 1974, 1975, 1976, 1977, 1978 
 Coppa Italia
 1973

References

Women's basketball teams in Italy
Basketball teams established in 1955
1955 establishments in Italy